The 4th Vietnam Film Festival was held from April 14 to April 21, 1977 in Ho Chi Minh City, Vietnam, with the slogan: "For the Socialist Fatherland and the people's happiness. For the development of the national cinema." (Vietnamese: "Vì Tổ quốc xã hội chủ nghĩa và hạnh phúc của nhân dân. Vì sự phát triển của nền điện ảnh dân tộc").

Event 
This is the first film festival of the unified Vietnamese cinema, honoring the achievements of composing in the first two years after Reunification.

This is the fourth Vietnam Film Festival, but it is the first time to gather cinematic artists and works from both North and South, so compared to the previous three festivals, the number of films participating has increased by one and a half times (69 films in total). Particularly, feature films and movies have not only increased in quantity but also in quality. The film festival also appeared many new units such as General Film Studio, Ho Chi Minh City Television Station. The number of delegates was also expanded, the number of which doubled. In addition to the jury in the film categories as last time, in 1977 there was also a technical jury.

A special feature of this film festival is that there have been many film selection contests held in advance to collect opinions from a wide range of viewers, helping the jury to consider more comprehensively and accurately. Regardless of the large number of viewers everywhere who watched the film first to participate in the film selection contest, in Ho Chi Minh City alone, there were over 500,000 viewers on this occasion. A large number of audiences are very passionate about the national cinema, follows every step and are interested in commenting, evaluating, and criticizing each contest film.

Also within the framework of the film festival, the Vietnam Film Association held a seminar with the theme "Striving to create many beautiful and rich artistic images about the new society and new people on the Vietnamese screen". The artists enthusiastically responded and participated in enthusiastic speeches. In addition, within the framework of the festival, there are also many meetings and contacts between filmmakers and a large audience of all backgrounds and ages.

The opening and closing ceremonies of the awards were held at the Rex Hotel, right next to City Hall. The documentary film "Chiến thắng lịch sử Xuân 1975" was screened on the opening day of the festival. This is the film festival with the fewest awards since the birth of the Vietnam Film Festival: there is only one Golden Lotus for the feature film "Sao tháng Tám" - the most complete film about the historical August Revolution. The film festival also only awarded two Golden Lotus for documentary film "Chiến thắng lịch sử Xuân 1975" and "Thành phố lúc rạng đông", no Golden Lotus for animated films.

Awards

Feature film

Documentary/Science film

Animated film

References 

Vietnam Film Festival
Vietnam Film Festival
1977 in Vietnam